Badilla may refer to:

People 
Gabriel Badilla (1984–2016), Costa Rican footballer
Leoncio Badilla Evasco Jr. (born 1944), Filipino politician
Rodrigo Badilla (born 1957), Costa Rican football referee
Sergio Badilla Castillo (born 1947), Chilean poet

Places 
 Badilla, Queensland, a neighbourhood in Home Hill, Australia
 , see List of municipalities in Zamora